The Australian cricket team toured the United Arab Emirates in March 2019 to play five One Day International (ODI) matches against Pakistan. The fixtures were part of both teams' preparation for the 2019 Cricket World Cup.

Ahead of the tour, the Pakistan Cricket Board (PCB) were in talks with Cricket Australia with a view to play some of the matches in Pakistan. On 10 February 2019, the PCB confirmed the dates of the tour, with all the fixtures taking place in the UAE.

The bans on Steve Smith and David Warner following the 2018 Australian ball-tampering scandal ended on 29 March 2019, coinciding with the date of the fourth ODI match. However, when Cricket Australia named their squad for the tour, Smith and Warner were not included. Trevor Hohns, chairman of the National Selection Panel, said that the best route for them coming back would be through the Indian Premier League.

Pakistan's regular captain, Sarfaraz Ahmed, was rested ahead of the 2019 Cricket World Cup, with Shoaib Malik named as captain of the squad in his place. For the fourth ODI, Imad Wasim captained the side for the first time, after Shoaib Malik was sidelined with a bruised rib. Wasim also captained Pakistan for the fifth and final ODI of the series.

Australia won the series 5–0. It was Australia's first 5–0 series win away from home since they beat the West Indies in 2008.

Squads

Pakistan's Faheem Ashraf was rested for the final three matches of the series. Jhye Richardson suffered an injury during the second ODI and was ruled out of Australia's squad for the rest of the series.

ODI series

1st ODI

2nd ODI

3rd ODI

4th ODI

5th ODI

Notes

References

External links
 Series home at ESPN Cricinfo

2019 in Australian cricket
2019 in Pakistani cricket
International cricket competitions in 2018–19
Australian cricket tours of Pakistan
International cricket tours of the United Arab Emirates